The Groswater culture was a Paleo-Eskimo culture that existed in Newfoundland and Labrador from 800 BC to 200 BC. The culture was of Arctic origin, and migrated south after the decline of the Maritime Archaic people following the 900 BC Iron Age Cold Epoch. It is believed to have been replaced by or developed into the Dorset culture around 2000 BP. It is named after Groswater Bay, a bay in central Labrador.

Archaeological Evidence 
Remains of animals found in Groswater sites imply a reliance on sea mammals, especially the Harp seal. Sea birds, small game, and Caribou also being hunted. Sites were situated on headlands and their tools were focused on hunting sea mammals. They demonstrate fine craftsmanship with stone tools, creating lithic and bone tools that were small and finely chipped. They used tools made from finely cut Chert, a rock used by the Paleo-Eskimo peoples of the North Atlantic. It is unclear why the Groswater Culture declined, although historians have hypothesized changes in climate and availability of marine animals as well as gradual replacement by the Dorset culture.

Tool Construction 
They demonstrate fine craftsmanship with stone tools, creating lithic and bone tools that were small and finely chipped. They used tools made from finely cut chert, a rock used by the Paleo-Eskimo peoples of the North Atlantic. Many of these tools are sourced from rock beds in Cow Head, Newfoundland.

See also 
 Early Paleo-Eskimo
 Thule
 Arctic Small Tool Tradition

References

Citations

Sources

Further reading

External links
 

Archaeological cultures of North America
Archaeology of Newfoundland and Labrador
Prehistory of the Arctic
Inuit
Peopling of the Americas
1st millennium BC in Canada